Lukas Felix Krüger (born 20 January 2000) is a German professional footballer who plays as a midfielder for FSV Zwickau.

Club career
Krüger made his professional debut for RB Leipzig on 2 August 2018, coming on as a substitute in the 70th minute for Matheus Cunha in the UEFA Europa League qualifying match against Swedish club BK Häcken of the Allsvenskan, which finished as a 1–1 away draw.

In July 2020, Krüger joined 3. Liga club SV Meppen from Regionalliga Nordost side Berliner FC Dynamo having agreed a two-year contract.

References

External links
 
 

2000 births
Footballers from Hamburg
Living people
German footballers
Association football forwards
RB Leipzig players
Berliner FC Dynamo players
SV Meppen players
FSV Zwickau players
Regionalliga players
3. Liga players